The Bafia (Baepak) people are a central African ethnic group that inhabit the Mbam and Sanaga River regions in the Centre Region of Cameroon. They are culturally related to the Bamum and Tikar people.

Names
A Bafia father will give his child a personal name to which his own name (patronym) is appended. For instance, a father named "Keman a Ndiomo" may call his son "Bitegni a Keman". The "a" in the middle stands for "son of".

Dance
The traditional dance of the Bafia is seen to convey a sense of heightened excitement and joy through posture and facial expressions. Dances are traditionally held after successful harvests, although they may also be performed during engagements, weddings, and other official events.

Religion
The earliest recorded religious tradition amongst the Bafia was that everything in the world developed from an egg.  Both feminine sexual forces, represented by a cave or hollow tree, and masculine sexual forces, represented by a snake or vine, were involved. There was no afterlife,  nor sin.
The notion  god don't really exist in bafia language only tatabell which is the godfather but strictly talking is the everything maker intelligent ( bell) and the only father of everything including us.
((tata)) mean ((father)) in bafia and if sin indeed don't really exist for bafia people darkness do exist and they were surrounding the almighty egg before the egg opening, bafia people believe darkness cannot forced someone to do wrongdoing, the sin is a foreigner word to explain their wrongdoing bafia believe.
Wrongdoing is not a consequences of darkness but the choice of people because of the love they have for darkness and wrongdoing.
Bafia believe that Afterlife don't really exist people and things which are all somehow part on the all mighty egg will go back to the all mighty egg because all always was from the all mighty egg except darkness that surrounds the egg

The turtle is respected as a traditional totem animal. 
Bafia people think that in the beginning of time after that one of their people have been killed and no one take the responsibility, during a conversation with the leaders and the bafia king a turtle passing by take the king attention.
Amazed by the fact that the turtle lift his house and therefore is in his house everywhere around the world and walk slow like the world don't affected him decide that the animal was the perfect representative of tatabell(godfather original form is an all mighty egg with everything in except darkness which was surrounding it) and decide that the turtle placed between the two believed to be the culprit will, with turtle direction, expose the killer

The bafia tribe is represented by the mygale ngam, a powerful Spider which represent the hunt mentally of the tribe.
They believe that everything from the spider was made for the hunt from the web to the eyes which they think see through the future and define de destiny,also very important to the hunt.
They also made a circular event calendar based on Ngam future eyes sight
Important*** the spider ngam is the tribe animal representation and the turtle's god(tatabell) representation

In center of bafia is the first lion statue made in the cameroun which is the animal representation of the country and the "spirit of Cameroonian" going with the sentence "impossible in not Cameroonian or in french; impossible n'est pas camerounais"

Bafia see the bafia people with the mind /spirit of the lion with the capability of the spider ngam under the protection of tatabell(godfather) represent by the turtle and thus have forbidden the killing or eating of the animal

Today, the dominant religion is Protestant Christianity ("Mareucana" is the Bafia term), although a small section of the population has converted to Islam (for which the Bafia term is "Moussouloumi").

List of Bafia dishes
Bafia people come from a Hunter tribe so they eat and dress(traditionally) like hunter
Often like many other tribes in Africa, the majority of the foods and plates are vegetarians but because bafia are hunter a piece of meat should be in every plates, often bafia people hunt wild beats and bush animal and the major market in bafia is a wild beats market.
Almost every bafia eat wild beats in their plates 
Bitosso (generally eaten with some sort of Maize pudding known locally as kipen (kipain))
Kidjan (Kidjan ki Tchen)
Gbarak (sticky saucy made with Okra and bush meat)
Koum-koum
Tien ti meukaaba
Tien ti nguita (sweet potato leaves)
Bichongneu
Zaap (bita leaves)
Bieeloe
Mouleuk (for seasoning)

List of Bafia villages
Bapep
Biabiyakan
Sanam
Biamesse
Biamo
Bitang
Dang
Donenkeng
Goufan
Gouife
Isèri
Kiki
Koro
Lablé
Mouko
Nyamsong
Nyokon
Roum
Rimis
Rionon
Tchekani
Yakan

References

Ethnic groups in Cameroon